Inventing the Abbotts is a 1997 American period coming-of-age film directed by Pat O'Connor and starring Liv Tyler, Joaquin Phoenix, Billy Crudup, Jennifer Connelly, and Joanna Going. The screenplay by Ken Hixon is based on a short story by Sue Miller. The original music score was composed by Michael Kamen. The film focuses on two brothers and their relationship with the wealthy Abbott sisters.

Plot summary 
The lives of two closely linked families dangerously intersect in a small Illinois town in the 1950s. Two brothers, J.C. and Doug Holt are being raised by their single, working mother in Haley, Illinois. Their father Charlie was a reckless risk-taker who lost his life when J.C. was two years old and Doug wasn't even born, after driving on a frozen lake over a bet made with Lloyd Abbott. Lloyd had just acquired Charlie's patent for a steel file-drawer in return for almost nothing, consequently becoming one of the town's wealthiest and most-admired citizens. Lloyd and his distant wife, Joan, are the parents of three beautiful daughters, Alice, Eleanor and Pamela. The parties for the girls' birthdays and other milestones are among the most waited events in the town.

Thinking his father's death was Lloyd's fault, and that the money raised from the patent was unfairly stolen from his family, J.C. seeks revenge on Lloyd through the calculated seduction of the Abbott daughters. First he hooks up with Eleanor, the wildest of the three. As a consequence of their relationship, she's sent away to a mental hospital, and will end up never returning to Haley again. Meanwhile, Doug, who initially admires his brother's libertine lifestyle, starts harboring reciprocated feelings for the youngest Abbott, Pamela. The two awkwardly circle each other, but she protests his early, fumbling sexual advances.

During a summer home from college, J.C. seduces the oldest Abbott daughter, Alice, who's divorcing her abusive husband after the birth of their daughter. The relationship between J.C. and Alice also leads to heartbreak, as well as to Lloyd taking extreme measures to keep them apart.

Amidst the complicated dynamics brought about by their siblings, Doug and Pamela meet again by chance while attending college at Penn and Bryn Mawr, respectively. Their reunion is once again thwarted by the reveal that J.C. has in the meantime started a sexual relationship with Pamela, too. This creates a severe fracture between the two brothers.

When Doug and J.C. come back home for their mother's funeral, they find the document confirming their late father had sold his patent for the very car he drove to his death on the lake. This knowledge doesn't comfort J.C., who still finds it deeply unfair that they were denied the wealth of the Abbotts for futile reasons. In the end, Doug convinces Lloyd of his true love for Pamela and the two finally find each other for good. The adult Doug who's narrating the story recounts how they married one year later and eventually gave birth to two daughters.

Cast 
 Liv Tyler as Pamela Abbott
 Joaquin Phoenix as Doug Holt
 Billy Crudup as John Charles "J.C." Holt
 Jennifer Connelly as Eleanor Abbott
 Will Patton as Lloyd Abbott
 Kathy Baker as Helen Holt
 Joanna Going as Alice Abbott
 Barbara Williams as Joan Abbott
 Alessandro Nivola as Peter Vanlaningham
 Michael Keaton as The Narrator / Older Doug Holt
 Zoe McLellan as Sandy

Production 
Though the film is set in rural Illinois, it was mostly shot in the region of Northern California, including the areas of Healdsburg, Petaluma, and Santa Rosa. The University of the Pacific in Stockton stood in for scenes set at the University of Pennsylvania.

Reception 
Inventing the Abbotts was not well received by critics. On Rotten Tomatoes the film has an approval rating of 33% based on reviews from 27 critics. On Metacritic, which assigns a weighted mean rating out of 100 reviews from film critics, the film has a score of 49 out of 100, based on 21 critics, indicating "mixed or average reviews".

Roger Ebert, in a 2-star review, praised the acting and the art direction, but criticized the story and slow pacing, saying the film lacked “the cheerful love of human nature that enlivened…Circle of Friends,” Pat O’Connor’s previous film which was also about young love in the 1950s.

Janet Maslin of the New York Times said of the young cast: “[Joaquin] Phoenix, so memorably mixed up and inarticulate in "To Die For," steps solidly into the assertive role of this film's narrator. [Billy] Crudup smolders well and leaves no mystery about J.C.'s power to attract the sisters. Ms. Connelly, often cast in cheesecake roles, gives this one a sly, vixenish spark.”

Emanuel Levy of Variety said the “cast of newcomers is appealing, but this small-town melodrama is so old-fashioned and out-of-touch with contemporary youth that it feels as if it were made the same time that its story is set, in 1957."

References

External links 

 
 
 
 

1997 films
1997 romantic drama films
American coming-of-age drama films
American teen drama films
American teen romance films
American romantic drama films
1990s English-language films
Films based on short fiction
Films produced by Brian Grazer
Films directed by Pat O'Connor
Films set in the 1950s
Films set in 1957
Films set in 1958
Films set in 1959
Films set in Illinois
Films set in Philadelphia
20th Century Fox films
Imagine Entertainment films
Films scored by Michael Kamen
Films about brothers
Films about mother–son relationships
Films about sisters
Films about families
1990s coming-of-age drama films
1990s American films
1990s teen romance films